It Started with a Kiss may refer to:

 It Started with a Kiss (TV series), 2005 Taiwanese television series
 It Started with a Kiss (film), 1959 film starring Glenn Ford and Debbie Reynolds
 "It Started with a Kiss" (song), 1982 hit single by Hot Chocolate